
Requena may refer to:

Places

Peru
 Requena, Loreto, capital of Requena Province, Peru
 Requena Province, Peru

Spain
 Requena, Valencia, a town in the Valencian Community
 Requena de Campos, a municipality located in the province of Palencia, Castile and León
 Utiel-Requena, a wine-producing region in the Valencian Community

People with the surname
 Cecilia Requena (born 1967), Bolivian politician
 Gladys Requena (born 1952), Venezuelan politician
 Manuel Requena (1802–1876), president of the Los Angeles Common Council in the early 1850s
 Yurema Requena (born 1983), Spanish swimmer who competed in the 2008 Summer Olympics